Albert Shakhov (born 5 October 1975) is a former Ukrainian professional football player and current manager of Volyn Lutsk.

Career
Albert Shakhov is a product of the Dnipro-75 sports school and started his career in clubs of the Dnipropetrovsk Oblast Metalurh Dniprodzerzhynsk, Shakhtar Pavlohrad, Metalurh Novomoskovsk. Couple of games Shakhov managed to play for his main club Dnipro, but in 1996 he first to Kremenchuk and later Israel.

Until 2000 Shakhov was returning to Ukraine on occasions and going back to Russia playing for lower league clubs in both countries. With a short stop in Lutsk, in 2001 he moved to Ivano-Frankivsk spending there few years.

Sometime in 2005 Shakhov moved to Crimea where he retired and remained with the newly organized FC Zhemchuzhyna Yalta until 2013.

In 2013 Shakhov moved to coach at the Volyn Lutsk sports school.

References

External links
 

1975 births
Living people
Ukrainian footballers
Association football midfielders
Ukrainian expatriate footballers
Expatriate footballers in Russia
Expatriate footballers in Israel
Expatriate footballers in Poland
Ukrainian expatriate sportspeople in Russia
Ukrainian expatriate sportspeople in Israel
Ukrainian expatriate sportspeople in Poland
FC Stal Kamianske players
FC Shakhtar Pavlohrad players
FC Metalurh Novomoskovsk players
FC Dnipro players
FC Kremin Kremenchuk players
FC Hirnyk-Sport Horishni Plavni players
Maccabi Petah Tikva F.C. players
FC Nyva Vinnytsia players
FC Volyn Lutsk players
FC Ural Yekaterinburg players
FC Spartak Ivano-Frankivsk players
FC Kalush players
FC Krymteplytsia Molodizhne players
MFC Mykolaiv players
FC Nyva Bershad players
FC Sokil Berezhany players
FC Yalos Yalta players
FC Khimik Krasnoperekopsk players
FC Sevastopol players
FC Feniks-Illichovets Kalinine players
FC Haray Zhovkva players
FC Zhemchuzhyna Yalta players
Ukrainian Premier League players
Ukrainian football managers
FC Volyn Lutsk managers
FC Dynamo Stavropol players